The 2017–18 Liga MX season  (known as the Liga BBVA Bancomer MX for sponsorship reasons) was the 71st professional season of the top-flight football league in Mexico. The season is split into two championships—the Torneo Apertura and the Torneo Clausura—each in an identical format and each contested by the same eighteen teams.

Teams, stadiums, and personnel 
These are the eighteen teams that competed in the 2017-18 season. Chiapas was relegated to the Ascenso MX after accumulating the lowest coefficient last season, and were replaced by the Ascenso MX Clausura 2017 champion Lobos BUAP, who won promotion after defeating the Ascenso MX Apertura 2016 champion Dorados de Sinaloa in the 2016–17 Ascenso MX Promotion Final.

Stadiums and locations

Personnel and kits

Managerial changes

Torneo Apertura 
The Apertura 2017 is the first championship of the season.

Regular season 
The season began on 21 July 2017 and ended on 19 November 2017.

Standings

Positions by round 
The table lists the positions of teams after each week of matches. In order to preserve chronological evolvements, any postponed matches are not included in the round at which they were originally scheduled, but added to the full round they were played immediately afterwards. For example, if a match is scheduled for matchday 13, but then postponed and played between days 16 and 17, it will be added to the standings for day 16.

Results

Regular Season statistics

Top goalscorers 
Players sorted first by goals scored, then by last name.

Source: Liga MX

Top assists 
Players sorted first by assists, then by last name.

Source: Soccerway

Hat-tricks

Clean sheets 

Source: Fox Sports

Saves 

Source: Fox Sports

Attendance

Per team

Highest and lowest 

Source: Liga MX

Liguilla – Apertura

Bracket 

 Teams are re-seeded each round.
 Team with more goals on aggregate after two matches advances.
 Away goals rule is applied in the quarterfinals and semifinals, but not the final.
 In the quarterfinals and semifinals, if the two teams are tied on aggregate and away goals, the higher seeded team advances.
 In the final, if the two teams are tied after both legs, the match goes to extra-time and, if necessary, a shootout.
 Both finalists qualify to the 2019 CONCACAF Champions League (champions as MEX1, runners-up as MEX3).

Quarterfinals

Semifinals

Finals

Torneo Clausura 
The Clausura 2018 is the second championship of the season. The regular phase of the tournament began in January 2018.

Regular season

Standings

Positions by round 
The table lists the positions of teams after each week of matches. In order to preserve chronological evolvements, any postponed matches are not included in the round at which they were originally scheduled, but added to the full round they were played immediately afterwards. For example, if a match is scheduled for matchday 13, but then postponed and played between days 16 and 17, it will be added to the standings for day 16.

Results

Regular Season statistics

Top goalscorers 
Players sorted first by goals scored, then by last name.

Source: Liga MX

Top assists 
Players sorted first by assists, then by last name.

Source: ESPNFC

Hat-tricks 

4 Player scored four goals

Clean sheets 

Source: Fox Sports

Saves 

Source: Fox Sports

Attendance

Per team

Highest and lowest 

Source: Liga MX

Liguilla – Clausura

Bracket 

 Teams are re-seeded each round.	
 Team with more goals on aggregate after two matches advances.
 Away goals rule is applied in the quarterfinals and semifinals, but not the final.
 In the quarterfinals and semifinals, if the two teams are tied on aggregate and away goals, the higher seeded team advances.
 In the final, if the two teams are tied after both legs, the match goes to extra-time and, if necessary, a shootout.
 Both finalists qualify to the 2019 CONCACAF Champions League (champions as MEX2, runners-up as MEX4).

Quarterfinals

Semifinals

Finals

Relegation table

Aggregate table 
The aggregate table (the sum of points of both the Apertura and Clausura tournaments) will be used to determine the participants of the Apertura 2018 Copa MX. This table also displays teams that have qualified for the 2019 CONCACAF Champions League.

See also 
2017–18 Liga MX Femenil season
2017–18 Ascenso MX season

References

External links 
 Official website of Liga MX

 
Mx

1
Liga MX seasons